Gymnobathra parca is a moth in the family Oecophoridae first described by Arthur Gardiner Butler in 1877. It is endemic to New Zealand. It has been hypothesised that this species likely belongs to another genus.

References

Moths described in 1877
Oecophoridae
Taxa named by Arthur Gardiner Butler
Moths of New Zealand
Endemic fauna of New Zealand
Endemic moths of New Zealand